The Battle of Malta took place on 8 July 1283 in the entrance to the Grand Harbour, the principal harbour of Malta, as part of the War of the Sicilian Vespers. An Aragonese fleet of galleys, commanded by Roger of Lauria, attacked and defeated a fleet of Angevin galleys commanded by Guillaume Cornut and Bartholomé Bonvin.

The Angevin ships arrived in Malta first, and proceeded to relieve the Angevin garrison, which was besieged within the walls of the Castello del Mare. The galleys were followed in close pursuit by an Aragonese fleet. Roger of Lauria easily out-maneuvered the  Angevin-Provençal fleet, and destroyed almost all of Cornut and Bonvin's vessels. Lauria then sailed back northwards, making a demonstration off Naples, raided the neighbouring coast, attacked and then garrisoned Capri and Ischia. The crushing defeat forced Charles I of Naples to postpone his plan to invade Sicily.

Background and planning

Following the rebellion of the Sicilian populace against the Angevins, the Maltese rose in a general insurrection on the islands in the autumn of 1282, bolstered by an Aragonese contingent led by Manfred de Lancia, who was Roger of Lauria's brother-in-law. The Aragonese besiegers were also led by Corrado I Lancia, first count of Caltanissetta, and brother of Manfred. The Provençal soldiers found themselves restricted in the Castello del Mare in the Grand Harbour, an ancient citadel which occupied one of the headlands marking the harbour, and the castle's suburb of Birgu. At this point the Castello del Mar was reinforced. Malta stood in a strategic location, with both sides anxious to control it.

Angevin planning
While at Marseilles, Charles I of Naples sent for Guillaume Cornut. The latter was a mercenary from an ancient Marseillais family, who was tasked by King Charles to set up a recruiting table to man twenty-five galleys with which to set sail at once for Sicily, and relieve the castle of Malta. By May 1283, the Angevin troops in the Castello del Mare had already been besieged for almost six months. The King bade Cornut to recruit "...men of good birth, all of Marseilles and of the coast of Provence, and not to put in a man of any other nation, but only true Provençals, and to provide them with boatswains and steersmen, and the prows should have double armament."

Upon providing relief to the Angevin soldiers besieged in Malta, Cornut was then ordered to "seek Roger of Lauria, who had not more than eighteen galleys, for the King of Aragon had not ordered more than twenty-two to be fitted out, and of these he had taken four to Catalonia, and so there did not remain more than eighteen." The Angevin plan was to either capture or destroy these vessels, and gain mastery of the sea.

In May 1283, the twenty-five Angevin-Provençal galleys equipped by Cornut, and also led by Bartholomé Bonvin arrived in Naples from Marseilles, where they refreshed their men. The two admirals then set sail from Naples, with a total of about eighteen galleys, eight or nine barques, and a panfilus.

The Angevins set sail around Sicily, by way of the Aeolian Islands and Ustica, then off Trapani and the west end of the island. The fleet avoided the Strait of Messina, which was in Aragonese hands. According to Ramon Muntaner, the Angevins had sent three light scouting galleys, towards the Boca del Faro, in front of the small tower of the Messina lighthouse. These three vessels were told rejoin the rest of the fleet at the castle of Malta.

Aragonese response

Roger of Lauria, following the instructions of the King of Aragon, equipped twenty-five galleys. Four of these, and a smaller vessel, were sent on to Trapani and to the King of Aragon. The remainder, namely, twenty-one galleys and two smaller vessels, were armed and manned with Catalans and Latins. Lauria took the smaller fleet, and raided the coast of Calabria, as far as La Castella d'Isola di Capo Rizzuto. The troops raided inland, attacking towns and homesteads.

After scouring Calabria, Lauria returned with the fleet to Messina. Upon entering the Strait of Messina from the east, Aragonese scouts met the three Provençal galleys which Cornut had sent into the Strait to reconnoitre. The Angevin scout ships were resting for the night, awaiting news. Lauria quickly organised his galleys and having surrounded the three Angevin scouts, blocked their escape.

Roger of Lauria soon learned all the Angevin plans regarding Malta. He quickly set sail for Messina, taking the three Angevin vessels with him. After landing his men and taking aboard fresh recruits, he left Messina and set sail for Malta. On his first sailing day he made for Syracuse, and asked for news on the Angevin-Provençal fleet. A barge had arrived from Gozo with news that the enemy fleet was already at Malta. The day after, the Aragonese set sail southwards, leaving Syracuse and reaching Capo Passero. After resting overnight, the Aragonese fleet set sail for the south east coast of Sicily, rather than head for Malta directly. After putting in at Fonte di Scicli, Lauria landed all his men to rest in Scicli to prepare themselves for the coming battle.

Battle

Before leaving Scicli, the Aragonese took with them a small barge, with eight oars. Their plan was to use it to scout Grand Harbour secretly, without being seen. The fleet embarked early, and reached the entrance of Grand Harbour at daybreak, just before matins.

Two small scouting galleys entered the port, led by the small barge at a "distance of a cross-bow shot." The barge entered through the port's channel straight in the middle, with the other scouting ships remaining on guard at each of the points of the harbour's entrance. The barge approached the castle, and found all the Angevin galleys with their oars unshipped and beached. Counting twenty-two galleys and two smaller ships the Aragonese barge then returned to Lauria to report its findings.

Roger of Lauria ordered his followers to put on their armour and set his galleys in order of battle. The Aragonese sailors wanted to enter harbour quickly and use the element of surprise, crying to "Let us attack, for they are all ours." Lauria refused and bade his sailors to blow their trumpets and announce their arrival in the harbour, saying that he did not wish that anyone would say that the Aragonese had only defeated their enemies because they found them sleeping. Muntaner explains that this was Lauria's first battle since being made admiral, speculating that he wished to show his naval prowess.

Lauria sounded his trumpets and began to enter Grand Harbour with his galleys formed in line and lashed together. The Provençals awoke and found Lauria's ships with raised oars. A hundred noble Frenchmen quickly came down from the castle, and reinforced the sailors in the galleys which put to sea. Cornut sounded his trumpets, hoisted his sails and set his galley onto Lauria's.

The fleets met in the middle of Grand Harbour, in an "attack so vigorous, that the prow of every galley was shattered, and the battle was most cruel and fierce." Crucially, as soon as the Provençals opened their volleys of arrows and missiles, Lauria ordered all his men, except the crossbowmen, to shelter in the galley's forecastles and behind the ship's bulwarks and hold their fire. Word was passed through to the sailors to hurl no weapons whatsoever until the Angevins' barrage stopped. The Aragonese "suffered the attack of the Provençal galleys wherefrom stones and lances and lime were cast in such deluge that the sight thereof was most fearful to behold." Only at midday, when the Angevins had depleted their missile munitions, did Lauria allow his troops to fire upon the Angevin ships. The Catalans' marksmanship, particularly their almogavars and their crossbowmen carried the battle for the Aragonese.

Detaching their lashings, the individual Aragonese galleys then moved in for the ship-to-ship assault. Once the Angevin galleys were grappled, the almogavars boarded the enemy ships, with the exhausted and heavily armoured French knights being no match for the agile Aragonese infantry.

The battle, which had begun at sunrise, lasted until the hour of vespers, with Muntaner remarking that "never could any man see more cruel a battle."  Although the Provençals had one more galley, and had been reinforced by a hundred men of rank from the castle, the Angevins could not hold their own against the Aragonese. Muntaner reports that before vespers a "full three thousand five hundred of the Provençals had been killed." On the boarded Angevins galleys, all who were found on deck were killed such that between the wounded and all those who hid below, "not five hundred men came out alive." Cornut, his kinsmen friends and the men of rank from the castle were all massacred. Muntaner states that Cornut fell in single-combat with Lauria. Desclot indicates that 860 prisoners were taken in the battle.

The Aragonese captured the remaining Angevin galleys, with one of the lighter Angevin scouting ships managing to put out to sea and escape. The ship, according to Muntaner, made its way to Naples and Marseilles with news of the Angevin disaster. However, Desclot mentions that Bartholomé Bonvin managed to force his way through the Aragonese fleet with about seven galleys – two of which were so heavily damaged they had to be abandoned. The rest were either sunk, or captured.

Aftermath

Lauria took his galleys and landed his troops on the western point of Grand Harbour, with his losses counted at three hundred dead and two hundred injured. At once, the Aragonese sent an armed barge to Syracuse, to make their victory known, while ten captured Angevin galleys were added to the fleet. Lauria ordered the King's officials in the city to send runners to Messina and to the rest of the Sicily. A captured Angevin fast ship was quickly manned and sent on to Catalonia, to the King of Aragon. Passing by Mallorca and Barcelona, the vessel sent a runner to inform the Aragonese court with the good news.

The Aragonese admiral gave up the King's share and his own right to the booty won by his soldiers, declaring the galleys and the Angevin prisoners to be enough. His soldiers gave Lauria their thanks, and rested for two days.

Securing Malta
After resting his men for two days, Lauria advanced with his banners raised on the city of Malta. The notables pleaded with him not to do any damage, saying that the city would put itself in the keeping and the command of the King of Aragon, and that Malta would surrender to Lauria. The admiral entered the city with his troops, and received the homage of the city and the island. Lauria left two hundred men to secure and garrison the city against the Angevins in the Castello del Mare. Lauria then briefly attempted to besiege the castle, but finding it impossible without catapults and siege equipment, he was forced to raise the siege.

The notables of Malta gave Lauria one thousand onzas in jewels and precious stones, as well as enough provisions to allow a safe passage to Messina. Then, Lauria set sail for Gozo, attacking the island and taking its ravelin. The city surrendered immediately, and received one hundred Catalan soldiers under the same terms as Malta. The men of Gozo gave jewels to the value of five hundred onzas, and further provisions for the Aragonese galleys.

Setting course for Sicily, the Aragonese fleet landed at Syracuse, and thence to Aci and Taormina. The victorious fleet was celebrated at every Sicilian harbour it landed.

Consequences
Muntaner asserts that after sharing the victory in Malta, the Aragonese and the Sicilians united themselves in the "bonds of friendship...which is an incontestable proof of good government."

The crushing defeat forced the postponement of Angevin plans to invade Sicily, established Aragonese naval tactic superiority and set the scene for the Battle of the Gulf of Naples in 1284. The Aragonese fleet continued to sail back northwards, and after making a demonstration off Naples, and raiding the neighbouring coast, Lauria attacked and then garrisoned the islands of Capri and Ischia.

References
Notes

References

Malta
1283 in Europe
13th century in the Kingdom of Sicily
Malta
Malta
Charles I of Anjou
13th century in Malta
13th-century massacres